Ovenbirds or furnariids are a large family of small suboscine passerine birds found from Mexico and Central to southern South America. They form the family Furnariidae. This is a large family containing around 315 species and 70 genera.  The ovenbird (Seiurus aurocapilla), which breeds in North America, is not a furnariid – rather it is a distantly related bird of the wood warbler family, Parulidae.

The ovenbirds are a diverse group of insectivores which get their name from the elaborate, vaguely "oven-like" clay nests built by the horneros, although most other ovenbirds build stick nests or nest in tunnels or clefts in rock. The Spanish word for "oven" (horno) gives the horneros their name. Furnariid nests are always constructed with a cover, and up to six pale blue, greenish or white eggs are laid. The eggs hatch after  15 to 22 days, and the young fledge after a further 13 to 20 days.

They are small to medium-sized birds, ranging from 9 to 35 cm in length. While individual species often are habitat specialists, species of this family can be found in virtually any Neotropical habitat, ranging from city parks inhabited by rufous horneros, to tropical Amazonian lowlands by many species of foliage-gleaners, to temperate barren Andean highlands inhabited by several species of miners. Two species, the seaside and the surf cinclodes, are associated with rocky coasts.

Taxonomy and systematics
The woodcreepers (formerly Dendrocolaptidae) were merged into this family, following analysis of sequences. While confirming the overall phylogenetic pattern, other scientists instead opted for maintaining the woodcreepers as a separate family, while splitting the ovenbirds (as traditionally defined) into two families, Furnariidae and Scleruridae.

The cladogram below showing the subfamilies of the ovenbirds is based on a molecular genetic study by Carl Oliveros and collaborators published in 2019. The species numbers are from the list maintained by the International Ornithologists' Union (IOC).

The systematics of the Dendrocolaptinae were reviewed by Raikow (1994) based on morphology and by Irestedt et al. (2004) based on analysis of nuclear and mitochondrial DNA. Using the latter approach, the suspected major lineages of the Furnariinae (foliage-gleaners, spinetails, and true ovenbirds) were confirmed, but some new lineages were discovered and the relationships of several genera had to be revised.

The taxonomic arrangement presented below is based on molecular genetic studies of ovenbird relationships. However, because ovenbirds and woodcreepers are treated here as a single family some taxonomic ranks were modified. For more detail see "List of ovenbird species".

Subfamily: Sclerurinae – miners and leaftossers
 Genus Geositta – miners (11 species)
 Genus Sclerurus – leaftossers (7 species)

Subfamily: Dendrocolaptinae – woodcreepers
Tribe: Sittasomini – "intermediate" woodcreepers
 Genus Dendrocincla – woodcreepers (6 species)
 Genus Deconychura – long-tailed woodcreeper
 Genus Sittasomus – olivaceous woodcreeper
 Genus Certhiasomus – spot-throated woodcreeper (genus introduced in 2010 for Deconychura stictolaema)
Tribe: Dendrocolaptini – "strong-billed" woodcreepers
 Genus Glyphorynchus – wedge-billed woodcreeper
 Genus Nasica – long-billed woodcreeper
 Genus Dendrexetastes – cinnamon-throated woodcreeper
 Genus Dendrocolaptes – woodcreepers (5 species)
 Genus Hylexetastes – woodcreepers (4 species)
 Genus Xiphocolaptes – woodcreepers (4 species)
 Genus Dendroplex – straight-billed woodcreepers (2 species, formerly in Xiphorhynchus)
 Genus Xiphorhynchus – woodcreepers (14 species)
 Genus Lepidocolaptes – narrow-billed woodcreepers (11 species)
 Genus Drymornis – scimitar-billed woodcreeper
Genus  Drymotoxeres – greater scythebill
 Genus Campylorhamphus – scythebills (4 species)

Subfamily: Furnariinae – Neotropical ovenbirds and allies
 Genus: Xenops – xenops (3 species)
 Genus Berlepschia – point-tailed palmcreeper
 Tribe Pygarrhichini
 Genus Pygarrhichas – white-throated treerunner
 Genus Microxenops – rufous-tailed xenops
 Genus Ochetorhynchus – earthcreepers (4 species formerly included in Upucerthia)
 Tribe Furnariini – horneros and allies
 Genus Pseudocolaptes – tuftedcheeks (3 species)
 Genus Premnornis – rusty-winged barbtail
 Genus Tarphonomus – (genus introduced in 2007 for 2 species formerly included in Upucerthia)
 Genus Geocerthia – striated earthcreeper (genus introduced in 2009 for U. serrrana)
 Genus Upucerthia – earthcreepers (4 species)
 Genus Cinclodes – cinclodes (15 species)
 Genus Furnarius – horneros (8 species)
 Genus Lochmias – sharp-tailed streamcreeper
 Genus Phleocryptes – wren-like rushbird
 Genus Limnornis – curve-billed reedhaunter

 Tribe Philydorini – foliage-gleaners and allies
 Genus Megaxenops – great xenops
 Genus Anabazenops – foliage-gleaners (2 species)
 Genus Ancistrops – chestnut-winged hookbill
 Genus Cichlocolaptes – (2 species)
 Genus Heliobletus – sharp-billed treehunter
 Genus Philydor – foliage-gleaners (5 species)
 Genus Dendroma – foliage-gleaners (2 species)
 Genus Anabacerthia – foliage-gleaners (5 species)
 Genus Syndactyla  – foliage-gleaners (8 species)
 Genus Clibanornis – (5 species)
 Genus Thripadectes – treehunters (7 species)
 Genus Automolus  – foliage-gleaners (10 species)
 Tribe Synallaxini – spinetails and allies
 Genus Margarornis – treerunners (4 species)
 Genus Premnoplex – typical barbtails (2 species)
 Genus Aphrastura – rayaditos (3 species)
 Genus Hellmayrea – white-browed spinetail
 Genus Sylviorthorhynchus – (2 species)
 Genus Leptasthenura – tit-spinetails (9 species)
 Genus Phacellodomus – thornbirds (10 species)
 Genus Anumbius – firewood-gatherer
 Genus Coryphistera – lark-like brushrunner
 Genus Pseudoseisura – cacholotes (4 species)
 Genus Pseudasthenes – false canasteros
 Genus Spartonoica – bay-capped wren-spinetail
 Genus Asthenes – canasteros (30 species)
 Genus Certhiaxis – spinetails (2 species)
 Genus Mazaria – white-bellied spinetail
 Genus Schoeniophylax – chotoy spinetail
 Genus Synallaxis – spinetails (36 species)
 Genus Siptornis – spectacled prickletail
 Genus Metopothrix – orange-fronted plushcrown
 Genus Xenerpestes – graytails (2 species)
 Genus Acrobatornis – pink-legged graveteiro
 Genus Limnoctites – reedhaunters (2 species)
 Genus Thripophaga – softtails (5 species)
 Genus Cranioleuca – typical spinetails (19 species)
 Genus Roraimia – Roraiman barbtail

The phylogenetic tree shown below is based on a large-scale genetic 2020 study of the suboscines by Michael Harvey and collaborators. The study found that some of the genera were paraphyletic. Adjustments to the classification have eliminated some of the paraphyly. The tawny tit-spinetail (Leptasthenura yanacencis) has been moved to the genus Sylviorthorhynchus, the sulphur-bearded spinetail (Cranioleuca sulphurifera) has been moved to the genus Limnoctites and its English name changed to the sulphur-bearded reedhaunter, and the white-bellied spinetail (Synallaxis propinque) has been placed in the monotypic genus Mazaria. These changes are included the tree shown below. The remaining paraphyletic genera are flagged in the tree by an asterisk.

In 2009 the large ovenbird family was divided into tribes by Robert Moyle and collaborators. The tribes as defined in the 2009 article do not fit well with the revised taxonomy of Harvey and are not included here. For example, the tribe Furnariini as defined in the 2009 article is not monophyletic in the Harvey taxonomy. The species numbers in the cladogram are from the list maintained by the International Ornithologists' Union (IOC).

References

Further reading

External links

Ovenbird videos on the Internet Bird Collection
Ovenbird sounds in the xeno-canto collection
A classification of the bird species of South America (Part 6) (SACC)

Higher-level bird taxa restricted to the Neotropics